Work Time Fun, known in Japan as  is a video game developed by D3 and Sony for the PlayStation Portable. The English title is a play on the slang "WTF", short for 'What The Fuck?', indicating confusion.

WTF was released in Japan on December 22, 2005, and in America on October 17, 2006. On October 2, 2008 it became available for download from the PlayStation Store.

The game's humor is derived from its satirical take on temporary or part-time employment. Players are paid a pittance for repetitive, menial tasks, with the only way to unlock more varied jobs being to grind through the boring ones. There is also an in-game email system, through which players can receive emails from fellow employees, award notices, and even spam offers which can decrease the player's funds.

Gameplay
The game contains over forty minigames, representing inane part-time jobs the player receives from the "Job Demon", which must be completed in a certain amount of time and at a certain difficulty, depending on the level. Examples include counting chickens (sorting newborn chicks into male, female, or dying), chopping wood (while trying not to chop cute cartoon animals that sometimes get put on the chopping block), putting caps on pens in a factory, karate, and other humorously repetitive minigames. By completing these minigames, the player earns money which can be used at a gashapon machine to randomly receive a new minigame, prizes for the gallery, or even a gadget that the player can use on the PSP outside of the game, such as a clock.

Reception

The game received "mixed" reviews according to the review aggregation website Metacritic.  In Japan, Famitsu gave it a score of one seven, one eight, one seven, and one six, for a total of 28 out of 40.

References

External links
 

2005 video games
Action video games
Minigame compilations
PlayStation Portable games
PlayStation Portable-only games
D3 Publisher games
Sony Interactive Entertainment games
Video games developed in Japan